Oreavu may refer to several places in Romania:

 Oreavu, a village in Valea Râmnicului Commune, Buzău County
 Oreavu, a village in Gugești Commune, Vrancea County
Oreavu (river), a tributary of the Râmna in Vrancea County